El Bosque may refer to:

Places
 El Bosque, Chile, municipality within Greater Santiago
 El Bosque, Chiapas, municipality and township in southern Mexico
 El Bosque, Cádiz, in Andalusia, southern Spain
 El Bosque, Uruguay, coastal resort in Canelones Department
 El Bosque, Cuba, in Camajuaní, Villa Clara Province

Universities
 El Bosque University, a university in Bogotá, Colombia

Airports
 El Bosque Airport, an airport in El Bosque, Santiago, Chile